Gervaise Macquart, Op. 119, is an opera in two acts by Giselher Klebe. His wife, Lore Klebe, wrote the libretto based on the novel L'Assommoir by Émile Zola.

The opera premiered on 10 November 1995 at the Deutsche Oper am Rhein, Düsseldorf, Germany, under the direction of August Everding, conducted by János Kulka, with Marta Marquez in the title role, Martha Mödl as Bazouga, Markus Müller as Lantier, and Gwendolyn Killebrew as Madame Goujet.

References

 Eleonore Büning: "Gefärbtes Wasser", Die Zeit (47/1995) 

German-language operas
Operas by Giselher Klebe
Operas
1995 operas
Operas based on novels
Operas set in France
Operas set in the 19th century
Les Rougon-Macquart